Koven, sometimes stylized as KOᐯEN or KOVEN., are an English electronic dance music duo made up of producer Max Rowat and vocalist Katie Boyle. They are especially known for their drum and bass and dubstep, but also make trap, future bass, house, pop and other styles. The duo are signed to Monstercat and hail from London, England.

Rowat started the project in 2011 and had several vocalists prior to Katie Boyle joining in 2014. They have guested on BBC Radio 1 shows including BBC Radio 1 Dance Presents with Hybrid Minds. They released their debut album Butterfly Effect in 2020, which was nominated for Best Album at the 2020 Drum & Bass Arena awards.

Personal life 
Katie is married, but not to Max.

Discography

Studio albums

Compilations 
 Retrospective (Viper, 2018)

Extended plays 
 Hereinafter, Pt. 1  (Viper, 2014)
 Hereinafter, Pt. 2  (Viper, 2014)
 Sometimes We Are (Viper, 2015)
 Come to Light (Monstercat, 2016)
 Reality Reach (Monstercat, 2018)
 Higher Ground (Part 1) (Monstercat, 2022)
 Higher Ground (Part 2) (Monstercat, 2023)

Singles

As lead artist

As featured artist

Remixes

References

External links
 

English electronic music duos
Drum and bass duos
British drum and bass music groups
Musical groups established in 2011
Musical groups from London
Monstercat artists
NoCopyrightSounds artists
2011 establishments in England